Sam Jacobs (born 10 April 1988) is a former professional Australian rules football player who played for the Greater Western Sydney Giants, Adelaide Crows and Carlton Blues in the Australian Football League (AFL). He was traded to Adelaide following the 2010 season. After the 2019 season Jacobs was again traded from Adelaide to Greater Western Sydney Giants. After a Covid affected 2020, Jacobs retired after 14 AFL Seasons.

AFL career

Carlton (2007–2010)
As a rookie-listed player, he played for Carlton's , the Northern Bullants, for the whole 2007 and 2008 seasons. Carlton retained Jacobs as a rookie in 2009; since rookie contracts are limited to two years, Carlton was forced to delist Jacobs, then redraft him, which they did with their sixth pick (number 76 overall) in the 2008 Rookie Draft. Jacobs played all four pre-season games for Carlton in the 2009 NAB Cup, and was made a nominated rookie prior the 2009 season, eligible to play AFL games. He made his debut in the first round of the season, against . He played only four games before succumbing to plantar fasciitis, causing him to miss most of the season. He returned from injury late in the year, finishing the season with the Northern Bullants, his ruckwork instrumental in getting the Bullants into the Grand Final, which they lost.

After three years as a rookie, Jacobs was promoted to the senior list at the end of the 2009 season. He played 13 games for the Blues and 10 for the Bullants during the 2010 season, again playing in a VFL Grand Final. At the end of the season, Jacobs requested to be traded back home to the Adelaide Crows. On 11 October, Jacobs was traded to the Crows in exchange for draft picks 34 (used for Patrick McCarthy) and 67 (used for Andrew McInnes).

Adelaide (2011–2019)
Jacobs played his first game for Adelaide in round 5, 2011, and held his place for the rest of the season, establishing himself as the club's premier ruckman. He ranked fifth in the league for hit-outs, averaging 32 per game. Jacobs stepped up further in 2012, leading the competition in hit-outs and hit-outs to advantage, finishing fourth in the Club Champion count and winning the club's Best Team Man award, although he was surprisingly left out of the All-Australian team. His season included a then-record 61 hit-outs in a match against  in round 15, for which he was awarded the Showdown Medal.

Prior to the 2013 season, Jacobs signed a three-year contract extension keeping him at the Crows until the end of 2016. Jacobs had a quieter season in 2013 but still ranked third in the competition for hit-outs. In 2014 he was back to his best, leading the AFL in hit-outs to advantage and improving his presence around the ground, having more disposals, marks and rebound 50s than any other ruckman. He continued in the same fashion in 2015, setting a new club record for hit-outs in a season with 859. Towards the end of the season he extended his contract by another three years, to the end of 2019.

He had another standout year in 2017. He played well in Round 2 against  then again in Round 6 against , where he dominated against Toby Nankervis, not only winning the hit-outs with a total of 50, but also getting 26 possessions, finding space in the midfield and helping to link up for the Crows. Playing against  in Round 8, in the absence of All-Australian ruckman Max Gawn to oppose him, Jacobs recorded a career-high 74 hit-outs. Unfortunately, the Crows' midfield struggled, mostly due to Rory Sloane being successfully tagged by ex-Crow Bernie Vince, so his effort didn't get the team the win. Jacobs continued to expand his influence outside of ruck contests, managing to get 25 disposals along with his 37 hit-outs in the Crows' Round 12 match against .

A week before Adelaide's qualifying final against , Jacobs' older brother Aaron died. He played against the Giants anyway and thoroughly outplayed his direct opponent Shane Mumford.

Greater Western Sydney (2020)
Jacobs struggled to break into the team due to the presence of Shane Mumford, and retired at the end of the 2020 AFL season.

Statistics
 Statistics are correct to end of round 12, 2016

|- style="background:#eaeaea;"
! scope="row" style="text-align:center" | 2009
| 
| 39 || 4 || 1 || 0 || 9 || 24 || 33 || 12 || 4 || 0.3 || 0.0 || 2.3 || 6.0 || 8.3 || 3.0 || 1.0
|-
! scope="row" style="text-align:center" | 2010
| 
| 39 || 13 || 2 || 2 || 53 || 95 || 148 || 38 || 53 || 0.2 || 0.2 || 4.1 || 7.3 || 11.4 || 2.9 || 4.1
|- style="background:#eaeaea;"
! scope="row" style="text-align:center" | 2011
| 
| 24 || 19 || 3 || 8 || 110 || 129 || 239 || 83 || 57 || 0.2 || 0.4 || 5.8 || 6.8 || 12.6 || 4.4 || 3.0
|- 
! scope="row" style="text-align:center" | 2012
| 
| 24 || 24 || 7 || 8 || 190 || 131 || 321 || 98 || 34 || 0.3 || 0.3 || 7.9 || 5.5 || 13.4 || 4.1 || 1.4
|- style="background:#eaeaea;"
! scope="row" style="text-align:center" | 2013
| 
| 24 || 22 || 4 || 5 || 143 || 105 || 248 || 71 || 42 || 0.2 || 0.2 || 6.5 || 4.8 || 11.3 || 3.2 || 1.9
|- 
! scope="row" style="text-align:center" | 2014
| 
| 24 || 22 || 7 || 3 || 193 || 165 || 358 || 90 || 46 || 0.3 || 0.1 || 8.8 || 7.5 || 16.3 || 4.1 || 2.1
|- style="background:#eaeaea;"
! scope="row" style="text-align:center" | 2015
| 
| 24 || 23 || 4 || 6 || 205 || 151 || 356 || 97 || 46 || 0.2 || 0.3 || 8.9 || 6.6 || 15.5 || 4.2 || 2.0
|- 
! scope="row" style="text-align:center" | 2016
| 
| 24 || 12 || 3 || 3 || 97 || 92 || 189 || 41 || 28 || 0.3 || 0.3 || 8.1 || 7.6 || 15.8 || 3.4 || 2.3
|- class="sortbottom"
! colspan=3| Career
! 139
! 31
! 35
! 1000
! 892
! 1892
! 530
! 310
! 0.2
! 0.3
! 7.2
! 6.4
! 13.6
! 3.8
! 2.2
|}

References

External links

 

1988 births
Living people
Adelaide Football Club players
Woodville-West Torrens Football Club players
Carlton Football Club players
Preston Football Club (VFA) players
Australian rules footballers from South Australia
Greater Western Sydney Giants players